Nimki is a 2019 Indian Odia language political propaganda film directed by Susant Mani. Varsha Priyadarshini plays lead role in this movie.

Plot  
This film is about the journey of a girl from Nimpur to Naveen Niwas, Bhubaneswar, in each step she finds new different obstacle but she never stops and find her way out.

Cast 
 Varsha Priyadarshini as Nimki 
 Anubhav Mohanty as Himself (Cameo Appearance)
 Ashrumochan Mohanty
 Chittaranjan Tripathy 
 Trupti Sinha
 Pragyan Khatua

Soundtrack
The music of the film is composed by Prem Anand.

References

External links

2019 films
2010s Odia-language films
Films directed by Susant Mani